James Christian "Jens" Petersen (11 December 1880 – 30 April 1953) was a builder and member of the Queensland Legislative Assembly.

Biography
Petersen was born in Rockhampton, Queensland, to parents Neils Petersen and his wife Maria Elizabeth (née Thorsen). He attended school in Rockhampton and became a builder, working in Rockhampton, Mount Morgan, and Sydney. He was secretary of the Rockhampton Workers Political Organisation in 1898.

In 1905 he married Cordelia May Dawbarn in Sydney and together had two daughters. He died in Sydney in April 1953 and was buried in Frenchs Forest Cemetery.

Political career
Petersen, at first representing the Labor Party, won the Queensland seat of Normanby at the state election of 1915, defeating the Liberal's Edward Archer. He held the seat until 1932 when he changed to Fitzroy and then retired from politics three years later.

He resigned from the Labor Party while still an elected member for the seat of Normanby and joined the Country Party because he was disillusioned with Labor's socialist policies. In his resignation speech he blamed the government for maladministration, the crippling of industry, the restriction of development and the creation of financial stringency and unemployment because of legislative measures.

Petersen's defection came at a crucial time for the Government as at the time there was a serious outbreak of influenza leaving the Government with a one-seat majority. Subsequently, Premier Theodore ordered two of the ALP's strongest members to bring a very sick Labor member into the chamber on a stretcher and transport him across from one side of the House to the other during the remaining divisions. He also introduced proxy voting whereby an ill, absent member's vote could be counted.

From 1929 until 1932 Petersen, by now a member of the governing Country and Progressive National Party, was the Home Secretary.

References

Members of the Queensland Legislative Assembly
1880 births
1953 deaths
20th-century Australian politicians